The Santa Paula Depot is a former railway station in Santa Paula, California. As a feature of the Fillmore and Western Railway, the station has been seen in various commercials, television shows, and feature films.

History
The station building was built in 1887 as part of the Coast Line and was the first train depot in Ventura County. Passenger services continued until 1934 and freight operations until 1975. It was designated a Ventura County Historic Landmark in 1972. The station currently houses the Santa Paula Chamber of Commerce.

The depot, depicting a rural Australian train station, appeared in the miniseries The Thorn Birds. Portions of the season 3 finale of Glee, titled Goodbye, were filmed at the depot.

References

External links
Santa Paula Chamber of Commerce

Buildings and structures in Santa Paula, California
Former Southern Pacific Railroad stations in California
Buildings and structures completed in 1887
Railway stations in Ventura County, California
Railway stations in the United States opened in 1887
Railway stations closed in 1934